"Just a Little Sign" is a song and single by German power metal band Helloween from their album Rabbit Don't Come Easy. It is about a depressed man going to a night club, intending to enjoy the music. He then unexpectedly falls in love with a woman there but is too afraid to tell her. Though this story sounds sad, the band delivers it in a humorous way.

Track list

Personnel
 Andi Deris - vocals
 Michael Weikath - guitars
 Sascha Gerstner - guitars on tracks 1 to 3
 Markus Grosskopf - bass guitar
 Mikkey Dee - drums on track 1
 Stefan Schwarzmann - drums on tracks 2 and 3
 Roland Grapow - guitars on tracks 4 and 5
 Uli Kusch - drums on tracks 4 and 5

References

2003 singles
Helloween songs
Songs written by Andi Deris